Nicky Adler (born 23 May 1985) is a German former professional footballer, who played as a striker, and current assistant coach of Lokomotive Leipzig. 

During his career, he has played for 1860 Munich, 1. FC Nürnberg, MSV Duisburg, VfL Osnabrück, Wacker Burghausen, SV Sandhausen, and Erzgebirge Aue. Adler has played internationally for Germany twice at under-19 and fourteen times at the under-20 level.

Club career
In 2003, he moved from the amateur ranks into the professional game as a player for TSV 1860 Munich and played 68 times in lower-league football before starting out as a senior player.

Adler made his debut in the top flight of German football on 1 September 2007 at Energie Cottbus. He was brought on late in the game for Gláuber and scored three minutes from time. However, the goal was disallowed despite no visible infringement. He resigned his contract with MSV Duisburg on 7 July 2010 and signed a two-years contract for VfL Osnabrück one day later.

International career
Adler played twice for the Under-19's national team, eleven times for the Under-20s (scoring four goals in the process).

Coaching career
Retiring at the end of the 2018–19 season, Adler took his coaching license. On 8 December 2019, he was hired as an assistant coach for his last club, 1. FC Lokomotive Leipzig, under head coach Wolfgang Wolf. On 18 May 2020, the club announced that Adler would leave the club at the end of the season so he could obtain the coaching license for the next level.

Career statistics

1.Includes relegation playoff.

References

External links
 

1985 births
Living people
Footballers from Leipzig
People from Bezirk Leipzig
Association football forwards
German footballers
Germany youth international footballers
TSV 1860 Munich II players
TSV 1860 Munich players
1. FC Nürnberg players
MSV Duisburg players
VfL Osnabrück players
SV Wacker Burghausen players
SV Sandhausen players
FC Erzgebirge Aue players
1. FC Lokomotive Leipzig players
Bundesliga players
2. Bundesliga players
3. Liga players
21st-century German people